Mala Hubajnica (in older sources also Mala Hubanjica) is a small settlement in the Municipality of Sevnica in east-central Slovenia. It lies in the hills south of Boštanj in an area that is part of the historical region of Lower Carniola. The municipality is now included in the Lower Sava Statistical Region.

References

External links
Mala Hubajnica at Geopedia

Populated places in the Municipality of Sevnica